Labrador tea is a common name for three closely related plant species in the genus Rhododendron as well as an herbal tea made from their leaves.

All three species are primarily wetland plants in the heath family. The herbal tea has been a favorite beverage among Athabaskan First Nations and Inuit.

Description
All three species used to make Labrador tea are low, slow-growing shrubs with evergreen leaves:
 Rhododendron tomentosum (northern Labrador tea, previously Ledum palustre),
 Rhododendron groenlandicum, (bog Labrador tea, previously Ledum groenlandicum or Ledum latifolium) and 
 Rhododendron neoglandulosum, (western Labrador tea, or trapper's tea, previously Ledum glandulosum or Ledum columbianum).

The leaves are smooth on top with often wrinkled edges, and fuzzy white to red-brown underneath.

R. tomentosum, R. groenlandicum, and R. neoglandulosum can be found in wetlands and peat bogs.

Uses
The Athabaskans and other indigenous peoples brew the leaves as a beverage.  The Pomo, Kashaya, Tolowa and Yurok of Northern California boil the leaves of western Labrador tea similarly, to make a medicinal herbal tea to help with coughs and colds. Botanical extracts from the leaves have been used to create natural skin care products by companies in Quebec and Newfoundland and Labrador. Others use Labrador tea to spice meat by boiling the leaves and branches in water and then soaking the meat in the decoction.

During the eighteenth century, German brewers used R. tomentosum while brewing beer to make it more intoxicating, but it became forbidden because it led to increased aggression.

Toxicology
There is no sufficient data that demonstrates Labrador tea is safe to consume as toxicity varies across species and localities. Excessive consumption  is not recommended due to diuresis, vomiting, dizziness, and drowsiness. Large doses can lead to cramps, convulsions, paralysis, and, in rare cases, death.

Toxicity occurs due to terpenoid ledol found in all Labrador tea species. R. groenlandicum has the lowest toxicity due to lower levels of ledol. Grayanotoxins are also present, but few lethal human cases of poisoning due to grayanotoxins in Labrador tea have been documented. However, lethal poisonings have been documented in livestock.

Harvesting
Labrador tea is slow-growing, so new single leaves are collected in spring from multiple plants to avoid damaging individual plants every other year.

References

Herbal tea
Inuit cuisine
Plant common names
Plants used in traditional Native American medicine
Plants used in Native American cuisine